S.T.H. (an acronym for Straight to Hell), also known as The Manhattan Review of Unnatural Acts, is an American gay pornography and erotic non-fiction zine founded by Boyd McDonald. It publishes autobiographical stories of male-male sexual encounters, as submitted by the magazine's readership. First published in the early 1970s, S.T.H. became an influential publication in New York City's arts and culture spheres, and counted notable literary figures such as William S. Burroughs, Allen Ginsberg, and Gore Vidal among its readership.

History
The precise date of S.T.H.s founding is unknown; the earliest known issue is #2, dated 1973. Publication is irregular, and early issues were not always dated nor copyrighted. The magazine was founded by Boyd McDonald, who edited the magazine from the early seventies through the mid-eighties. McDonald created S.T.H. as a magazine of reader-submitted male-male sex stories following his experience creating Skinheads, a zine about foreskin fetishism. He claimed to have been inspired to create the magazine after being visited by Gore Vidal's character Myra Breckenridge in a dream.

McDonald edited, typeset, mimeographed, and hand-assembled early issues of S.T.H. from a series of transient furnished rooms on the Upper West Side in Manhattan. Printing costs were paid with McDonald's welfare checks, and McDonald once joked that S.T.H. "was the only gay-sex magazine funded by the US government." At its peak, the magazine had a circulation of twenty thousand, which provided McDonald a modest income that he spent on male escorts.

McDonald turned over editorship of S.T.H. to Victor Weaver in the mid-1980s, and began focusing on publishing a series of anthologies that collected stories from the magazine (see Anthologies below); Meat, the first volume in the series, sold over 50,000 copies. Weaver was more readily accepting of S.T.H.s popularity in New York's arts and culture scene, and threw parties for the magazine at venues such as Danceteria and the Pyramid Club. Billy Miller became editor of S.T.H. in 1989, and in 2007 began a project to digitize back issues of the magazine. S.T.H. #68, the most recent issue of the magazine, was published in 2017 and edited by Miller.

Content
S.T.H. consists primarily of readers' submissions of stories of their sexual experiences. Submissions are edited only for length, with spelling and grammar errors intentionally left uncorrected; McDonald stated that "I find men who don't use punctuation are more fun in bed than those who do." McDonald encouraged contributors to read Ernest Hemingway and William S. Burroughs, and emulate their direct and unadorned writing style. He would often correspond with contributors, asking them detailed questions about their sexual habits and printing their answers. Stories were printed under titles that parodied tabloid newspaper headlines and TV listings guides, such as "10 Hawaiian Dongs Unload on Tourist" and "Mechanic’s Asshole Is Clean; Has Fragrance of Gasoline".

The magazine also published pornographic images, both reader-contributed and sourced from studios such as Old Reliable and the Athletic Model Guild. Issues published under McDonald's editorship also contained his commentary on sex, culture, and politics, particularly what he perceived as the hypocrisies of individuals and celebrities who were not fully accepting of their own desires.

Subtitles
Though S.T.H. is most commonly subtitled as The Manhattan Review of Unnatural Acts, the magazine is published under an ever-changing variety of subtitles, several of which parody the titles of other publications or reference other works:

 New York Review of Unnatural Acts 
 U.S. Chronicle of Crimes Against Nature
 The American Journal of Dick Licking
 New York Review of Cocksucking (New York Review of Books)
 The Manhattan Review of Cocksucking
 American Journal of Cocksucking and Current Affairs
 Archives of the American Academy of Homosexual Research
 The North American Horndog Reader
 New Amsterdam Journal of Trade
 The Manatus Raunch Gazette
 The Urania Spurting Times
 Feeled and Creemed
 Splorch Illustrated  (Sports Illustrated)
 The Official Organ of The Great East Ball Lickers Union – Local 6942
 W.H.O.R.E. International
 The Society for the Preservation of Quality Blow Jobs (Society for the Preservation of New England Antiquities)
 American Journal of Debauchery: Revenge Therapy
 Sperm Wars (Star Wars)
 The Rimmer's Digest (Reader's Digest)
 The Saturday Evening Ass-Licker (Saturday Evening Post)

Legacy and impact

McDonald described S.T.H. as both an artistic endeavor and a work of research, and spoke of its importance in documenting the lives of gay men in a period from the 1940s to the 1980s that he described as the "Golden Age of American Cocksucking". He described the magazine as being "not for the upward striving middle class but for guys who like to go down"; Bernard Welt argues that the S.T.H. represented McDonald's desire to replace pornography with smut, which McDonald saw as "sex that is truthful, idiosyncratic, and honest even about its own reason for being." Christopher Castiglia and Christopher Reed of Pennsylvania State University identify S.T.H., along with the journals Fag Rag and Heresies, as pioneering "a 'zine culture produced by and for queers."

S.T.H. counted multiple luminaries in arts and literature among its readership, consequently earning the nickname "the cumrag of the stars" from its editors. Notable readers include William S.  Burroughs, Allen Ginsberg, Christopher Isherwood, Tennessee Williams, Robert Mapplethorpe, Larry Mitchell, David Sedaris, John Mitzel, and Gore Vidal, with Vidal once describing the magazine as "one of the best radical papers in the country." Parties organized by S.T.H. were attended by John Waters, Fran Lebowitz. Kenneth Anger, Quentin Crisp, Taylor Mead, Cookie Mueller and Jackie Curtis. Felice Picano cited S.T.H. as a prominent gay publication in the 1970s and 80s. Conversely, John Preston was a critic of S.T.H., calling its readership "dirty", "filthy", "sick", "kinky", and "twisted".

In 2008, the Berlin-based art gallery Exile hosted "Straight To Hell presents: In Cock We Trust", an exhibition of S.T.H. material. In 2010, the White Cubicle Toilet Gallery in London hosted "Straight to Hell at White Cubicle:  An Installation by Jan Wandrag".

Anthologies
 
 
 
 
 
 
 
 
 
 
 
 
 
 

Note: There are 13 volumes in this series of anthologies. When originally published, the first in the sequence of publication had no volume number. The sixth in sequence of publication was erroneously marked volume 5 duplicating that volume number. The next two were marked volume 6 and volume 7, but were actually 7th and 8th in sequence of publication and the next two after that had no volume designation but were 9th and 10th in publication sequence. The final three volumes were marked volume 11, volume 12, and volume 13 matching publication sequence.

Notes

References

Bibliography

External links
 Official website
 Meat: How Men Look, Act, Walk, Talk, Dress, Undress, Taste & Smell – True Homosexual Experiences from Straight To Hell, Volume 1 at Internet Archive

1973 establishments in New York City
Irregularly published magazines published in the United States
Magazines established in 1973
Magazines published in New York City
LGBT-related magazines published in the United States
Zines
Pornographic magazines published in the United States
Gay male pornography in the United States
Gay male pornographic magazines